The 1986 Marshall Thundering Herd football team was an American football team that represented Marshall University in the Southern Conference (SoCon) during the 1986 NCAA Division I-AA football season. In its first season under head coach George Chaump, the team compiled a 6–4–1 record (3–3 against conference opponents) and played its home games at Fairfield Stadium in Huntington, West Virginia.

Schedule

References

Marshall
Marshall Thundering Herd football seasons
Marshall Thundering Herd football